Sumner Dewey "Tex" Tilson (July 5, 1898 – November 13, 1964) was an American football player and coach.  He served as head football coach at Virginia Agricultural and Mechanical College and Polytechnic Institute (VPI)—now known as Virginia Tech—for one season, in 1942, compiling a record of 7–2–1.  Tilson also played college football at VPI.

Biography
Tilson was born on July 5, 1898 in Childress, Texas to William Ransom Tilson and Sallie Ellen Williams. His grandfather Granville Tilson was a cattle trader in Matador, Texas. He died in November 1964 in Virginia.

Head coaching record

References

External links
 

1898 births
1964 deaths
American football guards
American football tackles
Virginia Tech Hokies football coaches
Virginia Tech Hokies football players
All-Southern college football players
People from Childress, Texas
People from Motley County, Texas
Players of American football from Texas